Louis Hiram Rutter (August 4, 1914 – November 9, 1971) was an American professional basketball player. He played in the National Basketball League for the Dayton Metropolitans in eight games during the 1937–38 season and averaged 10.0 points per game. Rutter also served in World War II as a ranger.

References

1914 births
1971 deaths
American men's basketball players
United States Army personnel of World War II
Basketball players from Ohio
Dayton Metropolitans players
Guards (basketball)
Otterbein Cardinals baseball players
Otterbein Cardinals men's basketball players
United States Army Rangers
People from Miamisburg, Ohio